Iran, officially the Islamic Republic of Iran and also called Persia, is a country located in Western Asia. It is bordered by Iraq and Turkey to the west, by Azerbaijan and Armenia to the northwest, by the Caspian Sea and Turkmenistan to the north, by Afghanistan and Pakistan to the east, and by the Gulf of Oman and the Persian Gulf to the south. Iran has an estimated population of 86.8 million, making it the 17th-most populous country in the world, and the second-largest in the Middle East. Its largest cities, in descending order, are the capital Tehran, Mashhad, Isfahan, Karaj, Shiraz, and Tabriz.

The country is home to one of the world's oldest civilizations, beginning with the formation of the Elamite kingdoms in the fourth millennium BC. It was first unified by the Medes, an ancient Iranian people, in the seventh century BC, and reached its territorial height in the sixth century BC, when Cyrus the Great founded the Achaemenid Persian Empire, which became one of the largest empires in history and a superpower. The Achaemenid Empire fell to Alexander the Great in the fourth century BC and was subsequently divided into several Hellenistic states. An Iranian rebellion established the Parthian Empire in the third century BC, which was succeeded in the third century AD by the Sassanid Empire, a major world power for the next four centuries. Arab Muslims conquered the empire in the seventh century AD, which led to the Islamization of Iran. It subsequently became a major center of Islamic culture and learning, with its art, literature, philosophy, and architecture spreading across the Muslim world and beyond during the Islamic Golden Age. Over the next two centuries, a series of native Iranian Muslim dynasties emerged before the Seljuk Turks and the Mongols conquered the region. In the 15th century, the native Safavids re-established a unified Iranian state and national identity, and converted the country to Shia Islam. Under the reign of Nader Shah in the 18th century, Iran presided over the most powerful military in the world, though by the 19th century, a series of conflicts with the Russian Empire led to significant territorial losses. The early 20th century saw the Persian Constitutional Revolution. Efforts to nationalize its fossil fuel supply from Western companies led to an Anglo-American coup in 1953, which resulted in greater autocratic rule under Mohammad Reza Pahlavi and growing Western political influence. He went on to launch a far-reaching series of reforms in 1963. After the Iranian Revolution, the current Islamic Republic was established in 1979 by Ruhollah Khomeini, who became the country's first Supreme Leader.

The government of Iran is an Islamic theocracy that includes some elements of a presidential system, with the ultimate authority vested in an autocratic "Supreme Leader"; a position held by Ali Khamenei since Khomeini's death in 1989. The Iranian government is authoritarian, and has attracted widespread criticism for its significant constraints and abuses against human rights and civil liberties, including several violent suppressions of mass protests, unfair elections, and limited rights for women and for children. It is also a focal point for Shia Islam within the Middle East, countering the long-existing Arab and Sunni hegemony within the region. Since the Iranian Revolution, the country is widely considered to be the most determined adversary of Israel and also of Saudi Arabia. Iran is also considered to be one of the biggest players within Middle Eastern affairs, with its government being involved both directly and indirectly in the majority of modern Middle Eastern conflicts.

Iran is a regional and middle power, with a geopolitically strategic location in the Asian continent. It is a founding member of the United Nations, the ECO, the OIC, and the OPEC. It has large reserves of fossil fuels—including the second-largest natural gas supply and the third-largest proven oil reserves. The country's rich cultural legacy is reflected in part by its 26 UNESCO World Heritage Sites. Historically a multi-ethnic country, Iran remains a pluralistic society comprising numerous ethnic, linguistic, and religious groups, with the largest of these being Persians, Azeris, Kurds, Mazandaranis, and Lurs.

Name

The term Iran derives directly from Middle Persian , first attested in a third-century inscription at Naqsh-e Rostam, with the accompanying Parthian inscription using the term , in reference to the Iranians. The Middle Iranian ērān and aryān are oblique plural forms of gentilic nouns ēr- (Middle Persian) and ary- (Parthian), both deriving from Proto-Iranian language *arya- (meaning "Aryan", i.e. "of the Iranians"), recognized as a derivative of Proto-Indo-European language , meaning "one who assembles (skilfully)". In the Iranian languages, the gentilic is attested as a self-identifier, included in ancient inscriptions and the literature of the Avesta, and remains also in other Iranian ethnic names Alan and Iron. According to the Iranian mythology, the country's name comes from the name of Iraj, a legendary prince and shah who was killed by his brothers.
As the most extensive interaction the ancient Greeks had with any outsider was with the Persians, the term persisted, even long after the Greco-Persian Wars (499–449 BC).

In 1935, Reza Shah requested the international community to refer to the country by its native name, Iran, on Nowruz, falling on 21 March 1935 (Esfand 30, 1313), 4:43 pm Tehran time; effective 22 March (the Iranian New Year on Farvardin 1, 1314) that year. Opposition to the name change led to the reversal of the decision in 1959, and Professor Ehsan Yarshater, editor of Encyclopædia Iranica, propagated a move to use Persia and Iran interchangeably. Today, both Iran and Persia are used in cultural contexts, while Iran remains mandatory in official state contexts.

Historical and cultural usage of the word Iran is not restricted to the modern state proper. "Greater Iran" (Irānzamīn or Irān e Bozorg) refers to territories of the Iranian cultural and linguistic zones. In addition to modern Iran, it includes portions of the Caucasus, Anatolia, Mesopotamia, Afghanistan, and Central Asia.

Pronunciation

Similarly, Glasgow-based Collins English Dictionary provides both English English and American English pronunciations. The pronunciation guide from Voice of America also provides .

The American English pronunciation  may be heard in U.S. media. Max Fisher in The Washington Post prescribed  for Iran, while proscribing . The American Heritage Dictionary of the English Language, in the dictionary's 2014 Usage Ballot, addressed the topic of the pronunciations of Iran and Iraq. With regard to the  pronunciation, more than 70% of the panelists deemed it unacceptable. Among the reasons given by those panelists were that  has "hawkish connotations" and sounds "angrier", "xenophobic", "ignorant", and "not... cosmopolitan". The  pronunciation remains standard and acceptable, reflected in the entry for Iran in the American Heritage Dictionary itself, as well as in each of the other major dictionaries of American English.

History

Prehistory

The earliest attested archaeological artifacts in Iran, like those excavated at Kashafrud and Ganj Par in northern Iran, confirm a human presence in Iran since the Lower Paleolithic. Iran's Neanderthal artifacts from the Middle Paleolithic have been found mainly in the Zagros region, at sites such as Warwasi and Yafteh. From the tenth to the seventh millennium BC, early agricultural communities began to flourish in and around the Zagros region in western Iran, including Chogha Golan, Chogha Bonut, and Chogha Mish.

The occupation of grouped hamlets in the area of Susa, as determined by radiocarbon dating, ranges from 4395–3955 to 3680–3490 BC. There are dozens of prehistoric sites across the Iranian Plateau, pointing to the existence of ancient cultures and urban settlements in the fourth millennium BC. During the Bronze Age, the territory of present-day Iran was home to several civilizations, including Elam, Jiroft, and Zayanderud. Elam, the most prominent of these civilizations, developed in the southwest alongside those in Mesopotamia, and continued its existence until the emergence of the Iranian empires. The advent of writing in Elam was paralleled to Sumer, and the Elamite cuneiform was developed since the third millennium BC.

From the 34th to the 20th century BC, northwestern Iran was part of the Kura-Araxes culture, which stretched into the neighboring Caucasus and Anatolia. Since the earliest second millennium BC, Assyrians settled in swaths of western Iran and incorporated the region into their territories.

Classical antiquity

By the second millennium BC, the ancient Iranian peoples arrived in what is now Iran from the Eurasian Steppe, rivaling the native settlers of the region. As the Iranians dispersed into the wider area of Greater Iran and beyond, the boundaries of modern-day Iran were dominated by Median, Persian, and Parthian tribes.

From the late tenth to the late seventh century BC, the Iranian peoples, together with the "pre-Iranian" kingdoms, fell under the domination of the Assyrian Empire, based in northern Mesopotamia. Under king Cyaxares, the Medes and Persians entered into an alliance with Babylonian ruler Nabopolassar, as well as the fellow Iranian Scythians and Cimmerians, and together they attacked the Assyrian Empire. The civil war ravaged the Assyrian Empire between 616 and 605 BC, thus freeing their respective peoples from three centuries of Assyrian rule. The unification of the Median tribes under king Deioces in 728 BC led to the foundation of the Median Empire which, by 612 BC, controlled almost the entire territory of present-day Iran and eastern Anatolia. This marked the end of the Kingdom of Urartu as well, which was subsequently conquered and dissolved.

In 550 BC, Cyrus the Great, the son of Mandane and Cambyses I, took over the Median Empire, and founded the Achaemenid Empire by unifying other city-states. The conquest of Media was a result of what is called the Persian Revolt. The brouhaha was initially triggered by the actions of the Median ruler Astyages, and was quickly spread to other provinces as they allied with the Persians. Later conquests under Cyrus and his successors expanded the empire to include Lydia, Babylon, Egypt, parts of the Balkans and Eastern Europe proper, as well as the lands to the west of the Indus and Oxus rivers.

539 BC was the year in which Persian forces defeated the Babylonian army at Opis, and marked the end of around four centuries of Mesopotamian domination of the region by conquering the Neo-Babylonian Empire. Cyrus entered Babylon and presented himself as a traditional Mesopotamian monarch. Subsequent Achaemenid art and iconography reflect the influence of the new political reality in Mesopotamia.

At its greatest extent, the Achaemenid Empire included territories of modern-day Iran, Republic of Azerbaijan (Arran and Shirvan), Armenia, Georgia, Turkey (Anatolia), much of the Black Sea coastal regions, northeastern Greece and southern Bulgaria (Thrace), northern Greece and North Macedonia (Paeonia and Macedon), Iraq, Syria, Lebanon, Jordan, Israel and the Palestinian territories, all significant population centers of ancient Egypt as far west as Libya, Kuwait, northern Saudi Arabia, parts of the United Arab Emirates and Oman, Pakistan, Afghanistan, and much of Central Asia, making it the largest empire the world had yet seen.

It is estimated that in 480 BC, 50 million people lived in the Achaemenid Empire. The empire at its peak ruled over 44% of the world's population, the highest such figure for any empire in history.

The Achaemenid Empire is noted for the release of the Jewish exiles in Babylon, building infrastructures such as the Royal Road and the Chapar (postal service), and the use of an official language, Imperial Aramaic, throughout its territories. The empire had a centralized, bureaucratic administration under the emperor, a large professional army, and civil services, inspiring similar developments in later empires.

Eventual conflict on the western borders began with the Ionian Revolt, which erupted into the Greco-Persian Wars and continued through the first half of the fifth century BC, and ended with the withdrawal of the Achaemenids from all of the territories in the Balkans and Eastern Europe proper.

In 334 BC, Alexander the Great invaded the Achaemenid Empire, defeating the last Achaemenid emperor, Darius III, at the Battle of Issus. Following the premature death of Alexander, Iran came under the control of the Hellenistic Seleucid Empire. In the middle of the second century BC, the Parthian Empire rose to become the main power in Iran, and the century-long geopolitical arch-rivalry between the Romans and the Parthians began, culminating in the Roman–Parthian Wars. The Parthian Empire continued as a feudal monarchy for nearly five centuries, until 224 CE, when it was succeeded by the Sasanian Empire. Together with their neighboring arch-rival, the Roman-Byzantines, they made up the world's two most dominant powers at the time, for over four centuries.

The Sasanians established an empire within the frontiers achieved by the Achaemenids, with their capital at Ctesiphon. Late antiquity is considered one of Iran's most influential periods, as under the Sasanians, their influence reached the culture of ancient Rome (and through that as far as Western Europe), Africa, China, and India, and played a prominent role in the formation of the medieval art of both Europe and Asia.

Most of the era of the Sasanian Empire was overshadowed by the Roman–Persian Wars, which raged on the western borders at Anatolia, the Western Caucasus, Mesopotamia, and the Levant, for over 700 years. These wars ultimately exhausted both the Romans and the Sasanians and led to the defeat of both by the Muslim invasion.

Throughout the Achaemenid, Parthian, and Sasanian eras, several offshoots of the Iranian dynasties established eponymous branches in Anatolia and the Caucasus, including the Pontic Kingdom, the Mihranids, and the Arsacid dynasties of Armenia, Iberia (Georgia), and Caucasian Albania (present-day Republic of Azerbaijan and southern Dagestan).

Medieval period

The prolonged Byzantine–Sasanian wars, most importantly the climactic war of 602–628, as well as the social conflict within the Sasanian Empire, opened the way for an Arab invasion of Iran in the seventh century. The empire was initially defeated by the Rashidun Caliphate, which was succeeded by the Umayyad Caliphate, followed by the Abbasid Caliphate. A prolonged and gradual process of state-imposed Islamization followed, which targeted Iran's then Zoroastrian majority and included religious persecution, demolition of libraries and fire temples, a special tax penalty ("jizya"), and language shift.

In 750, the Abbasids overthrew the Umayyads. Arabs Muslims and Persians of all strata made up the rebel army, which was united by the converted Persian Muslim, Abu Muslim. In their struggle for power, the society in their times gradually became cosmopolitan and the old Arab simplicity and aristocratic dignity, bearing and prestige were lost. Persians and Turks began to replace the Arabs in most fields. The fusion of the Arab nobility with the subject races, the practice of polygamy and concubinage, made for a social amalgam wherein loyalties became uncertain and a hierarchy of officials emerged, a bureaucracy at first Persian and later Turkish which decreased Abbasid prestige and power for good.

After two centuries of Arab rule, semi-independent and independent Iranian kingdoms—including the Tahirids, Saffarids, Samanids, and Buyids—began to appear on the fringes of the declining Abbasid Caliphate. 

The blossoming literature, philosophy, mathematics, medicine, astronomy and art of Iran became major elements in the formation of a new age for the Iranian civilization, during a period known as the Islamic Golden Age. The Islamic Golden Age reached its peak by the 10th and 11th centuries, during which Iran was the main theater of scientific activities.

The tenth century saw a mass migration of Turkic tribes from Central Asia into the Iranian Plateau. Turkic tribesmen were first used in the Abbasid army as mamluks (slave-warriors), replacing Iranian and Arab elements within the army. As a result, the Mamluks gained significant political power. In 999, large portions of Iran came briefly under the rule of the Ghaznavids, whose rulers were of mamluk Turkic origin, and longer subsequently under the Seljuk and Khwarezmian empires. The Seljuks subsequently gave rise to the Sultanate of Rum in Anatolia, while taking their thoroughly Persianized identity with them. The result of the adoption and patronage of Persian culture by Turkish rulers was the development of a distinct Turco-Persian tradition.

From 1219 to 1221, under the Khwarazmian Empire, Iran suffered a devastating invasion by the Mongol Empire army of Genghis Khan. According to Steven R. Ward, "Mongol violence and depredations killed up to three-fourths of the population of the Iranian Plateau, possibly 10 to 15 million people. Some historians have estimated that Iran's population did not again reach its pre-Mongol levels until the mid-20th century." Most modern historians either outright dismiss or are highly skeptical of such statistics of colossal magnitude pertaining the Mongol onslaught on the Khwarazmian empire, mainland Iran and other Muslim regions and deem them to be exaggerations by Muslim chroniclers of that era (whose recordings were naturally of an anti-Mongol bent). Indeed, as far as the Iranian plateau was concerned, the bulk of the Mongol onslaught and battles were in the northeast of what is modern-day Iran, such as in the cities of Nishapur and Tus.

Following the fracture of the Mongol Empire in 1256, Hulagu Khan, grandson of Genghis Khan, established the Ilkhanate in Iran. In 1357, the capital Tabriz was occupied by the Golden Horde khan Jani Beg and the centralized power collapsed, resulting in the emergence of rivaling dynasties. In 1370, yet another conqueror, Timur from Transoxiana, took control over Persia, establishing the Timurid Empire which lasted for another 156 years. In 1387, Timur ordered the complete massacre of Isfahan, reportedly killing 70,000 citizens. The Ilkhans and the Timurids soon came to adopt the ways and customs of the Iranians, surrounding themselves with a culture that was distinctively Iranian.

Early modern period

Safavids

By the 1500s, Ismail I of Ardabil established the Safavid Empire, with his capital at Tabriz. Beginning with Azerbaijan, he subsequently extended his authority over all of the Iranian territories, and established an intermittent Iranian hegemony over the vast relative regions, reasserting the Iranian identity within large parts of Greater Iran. Iran was predominantly Sunni, but Ismail instigated a forced conversion to the Shia branch of Islam, spreading throughout the Safavid territories in the Caucasus, Iran, Anatolia, and Mesopotamia. As a result, modern-day Iran is the only official Shia nation of the world, with it holding an absolute majority in Iran and the Republic of Azerbaijan, having there the first and the second highest number of Shia inhabitants by population percentage in the world. Meanwhile, the centuries-long geopolitical and ideological rivalry between Safavid Iran and the neighboring Ottoman Empire led to numerous Ottoman–Iranian wars.

The Safavid era peaked in the reign of Abbas I (1587–1629), surpassing their Turkish archrivals in strength, and making Iran a leading science and art hub in western Eurasia. The Safavid era saw the start of mass integration from Caucasian populations into new layers of the society of Iran, as well as mass resettlement of them within the heartlands of Iran, playing a pivotal role in the history of Iran for centuries onwards. Following a gradual decline in the late 1600s and the early 1700s, which was caused by internal conflicts, the continuous wars with the Ottomans, and the foreign interference (most notably the Russian interference), the Safavid rule was ended by the Pashtun rebels who besieged Isfahan and defeated Sultan Husayn in 1722.

Afsharids

In 1729, Nader Shah, a chieftain and military genius from Khorasan, successfully drove out and conquered the Pashtun invaders. He subsequently took back the annexed Caucasian territories which were divided among the Ottoman and Russian authorities by the ongoing chaos in Iran. During the reign of Nader Shah, Iran reached its greatest extent since the Sasanian Empire, reestablishing the Iranian hegemony all over the Caucasus, as well as other major parts of the west and central Asia, and briefly possessing what was arguably the most powerful empire at the time. 

Nader Shah invaded India and sacked far off Delhi by the late 1730s. His territorial expansion, as well as his military successes, went into a decline following the final campaigns in the Northern Caucasus against then revolting Lezgins. The assassination of Nader Shah sparked a brief period of civil war and turmoil, after which Karim Khan of the Zand dynasty came to power in 1750, bringing a period of relative peace and prosperity.

Zands

Compared to its preceding dynasties, the geopolitical reach of the Zand dynasty was limited. Many of the Iranian territories in the Caucasus gained de facto autonomy and were locally ruled through various Caucasian khanates. However, despite the self-ruling, they all remained subjects and vassals to the Zand king. Another civil war ensued after the death of Karim Khan in 1779, out of which Agha Mohammad Khan emerged, founding the Qajar dynasty in 1794.

Qajars

In 1795, following the disobedience of the Georgian subjects and their alliance with the Russians, the Qajars captured Tbilisi by the Battle of Krtsanisi, and drove the Russians out of the entire Caucasus, reestablishing the Iranian suzerainty over the region.

The Russo-Iranian wars of 1804–1813 and 1826–1828 resulted in large irrevocable territorial losses for Iran in the Caucasus, comprising all of the South Caucasus and Dagestan, which made part of the very concept of Iran for centuries, and thus substantial gains for the neighboring Russian Empire.

As a result of the 19th-century Russo-Iranian wars, the Russians took over the Caucasus, and Iran irrevocably lost control over its integral territories in the region (comprising modern-day Dagestan, Georgia, Armenia, and Republic of Azerbaijan), which got confirmed per the treaties of Gulistan and Turkmenchay. The area to the north of Aras River, among which the contemporary Republic of Azerbaijan, eastern Georgia, Dagestan, and Armenia are located, were Iranian territory until they were occupied by Russia in the course of the 19th century. The weakening of Persia made it into a victim of the colonial struggle between Russia and Britain known as the Great Game. Especially after the treaty of Turkmenchay, Russia was the dominant force in Iran, while the Qajars would also play a role in several 'Great Game' battles such as the sieges of Herat in 1837 and 1856.

As Iran shrank, many South Caucasian and North Caucasian Muslims moved towards Iran, especially until the aftermath of the Circassian Genocide, and the decades afterwards, while Iran's Armenians were encouraged to settle in the newly incorporated Russian territories, causing significant demographic shifts.

Around 1.5 million people—20 to 25% of the population of Iran—died as a result of the Great Famine of 1870–1872.

Between 1872 and 1905, a series of protests took place in response to the sale of concessions to foreigners by Qajar monarchs Naser-ed-Din and Mozaffar-ed-Din, and led to the Constitutional Revolution in 1905. The first Iranian constitution and the first national parliament of Iran were founded in 1906, through the ongoing revolution. The Constitution included the official recognition of Iran's three religious minorities, namely Christians, Jews, and Zoroastrians, which has remained a basis in the legislation of Iran since then. The struggle related to the constitutional movement was followed by the Triumph of Tehran in 1909, when Mohammad Ali Shah was defeated and forced to abdicate. In 1907, the Anglo-Russian Convention divided Qajar Iran into influence zones, formalising many of the concessions. On the pretext of restoring order, the Russians occupied northern Iran and the city of Tabriz and maintained a military presence in the region for years to come. But this did not put an end to the civil uprisings and was soon followed by Mirza Kuchik Khan's Jungle Movement against both the Qajar monarchy and foreign invaders. 

Despite Iran's neutrality during World War I, the Ottoman, Russian and British empires occupied the territory of western Iran and fought the Persian Campaign before fully withdrawing their forces in 1921. At least 2 million Persian civilians died either directly in the fighting, the Ottoman perpetrated anti-Christian genocides or the war-induced famine of 1917–1919. A large number of Iranian Assyrian and Iranian Armenian Christians, as well as those Muslims who tried to protect them, were victims of mass murders committed by the invading Ottoman troops, notably in and around Khoy, Maku, Salmas, and Urmia.

Apart from the rule of Agha Mohammad Khan, the Qajar rule is characterized as a century of misrule. The inability of Qajar Iran's government to maintain the country's sovereignty during and immediately after World War I led to the British directed 1921 Persian coup d'état and Reza Shah's establishment of the Pahlavi dynasty. Reza Shah, became the new Prime Minister of Iran and was declared the new monarch in 1925.

Pahlavis

In the midst of World War II, in June 1941, Nazi Germany broke the Molotov–Ribbentrop Pact and invaded the Soviet Union, Iran's northern neighbor. The Soviets quickly allied themselves with the Allied countries and in July and August 1941 the British demanded that the Iranian government expel all Germans from Iran. Reza Shah refused to expel the Germans and on 25 August 1941, the British and Soviets launched a surprise invasion and Reza Shah's government quickly surrendered. The invasion's strategic purpose was to secure a supply line to the USSR (later named the Persian Corridor), secure the oil fields and Abadan Refinery (of the UK-owned Anglo-Iranian Oil Company), prevent a German advance via Turkey or the USSR on Baku's oil fields, and limit German influence in Iran. Following the invasion, on 16 September 1941 Reza Shah abdicated and was replaced by Mohammad Reza Pahlavi, his 21-year-old son.

During the rest of World War II, Iran became a major conduit for British and American aid to the Soviet Union and an avenue through which over 120,000 Polish refugees and Polish Armed Forces fled the Axis advance. At the 1943 Tehran Conference, the Allied "Big Three"—Joseph Stalin, Franklin D. Roosevelt, and Winston Churchill—issued the Tehran Declaration to guarantee the post-war independence and boundaries of Iran. However, at the end of the war, Soviet troops remained in Iran and established two puppet states in north-western Iran, namely the People's Government of Azerbaijan and the Republic of Mahabad. This led to the Iran crisis of 1946, one of the first confrontations of the Cold War, which ended after oil concessions were promised to the USSR and Soviet forces withdrew from Iran proper in May 1946. The two puppet states were soon overthrown, and the oil concessions were later revoked.

1951–1978: Mosaddegh, Mohammad Reza Pahlavi

In 1951, Mohammad Mosaddegh was appointed as the Prime Minister of Pahlavi Iran. After the nationalization of Iran's oil industry, he became enormously popular.  He was deposed in the 1953 Iranian coup d'état, an Anglo-American covert operation that marked the first time the United States had participated in an overthrow of a foreign government during the Cold War.

After the coup, the Shah became increasingly autocratic and sultanistic, and Iran entered a decades-long phase of controversially close relations with the United States and some other foreign governments. While the Shah increasingly modernized Iran and claimed to retain it as a fully secular state, arbitrary arrests and torture by his secret police, the SAVAK, were used for crushing all forms of political opposition.

Ruhollah Khomeini, a radical Muslim cleric, became an active critic of the Shah's far-reaching series of reforms known as the White Revolution. Khomeini publicly denounced the government, and was arrested and imprisoned for 18 months. After his release in 1964, he refused to apologize and was eventually sent into exile.

Due to the 1973 spike in oil prices, the economy of Iran was flooded with foreign currency, which caused inflation. By 1974, the economy of Iran was experiencing a double-digit inflation rate, and despite the many large projects to modernize the country, corruption was rampant and caused large amounts of waste. By 1975 and 1976, an economic recession led to an increased unemployment rate, especially among millions of youths who had migrated to the cities of Iran looking for construction jobs during the boom years of the early 1970s. By the late 1970s, many of these people opposed the Shah's regime and began organizing and joining the protests against it.

After the 1979 Iranian Revolution

The 1979 Revolution, later known as the Islamic Revolution, began in January 1978 with the first major demonstrations against the Shah. After a year of strikes and demonstrations paralyzing the country and its economy, Mohammad Reza Pahlavi fled to the United States, and Ruhollah Khomeini returned from exile to Tehran in February 1979, forming a new government. After holding a referendum, Iran officially became an Islamic republic in April 1979. A second referendum in December 1979 approved a theocratic constitution.

The immediate nationwide uprisings against the new government began with the 1979 Kurdish rebellion and the Khuzestan uprisings, along with the uprisings in Sistan and Baluchestan and other areas. Over the next several years, these uprisings were subdued violently by the new Islamic government. The new government began purging itself of the non-Islamist political opposition, as well as of those Islamists who were not considered radical enough. Although both nationalists and Marxists had initially joined with Islamists to overthrow the Shah, tens of thousands were executed by the new regime afterward. Following Khomeini's order to purge the new government of any remaining officials still loyal to the exiled Shah, many former ministers and officials in the Shah's government, including former prime minister Amir-Abbas Hoveyda, were executed.

On 4 November 1979, after the United States refusal for the extradition of Mohammad Reza Pahlavi to the new government, a group of Muslim students seized the United States Embassy and took the embassy with 52 personnel and citizens hostage . Attempts by the Jimmy Carter administration to negotiate for the release of the hostages, and a failed rescue attempt, helped with the falling popularity of Carter among the US citizens and it pushed him out of the presidential office and brought Ronald Reagan to power. On Jimmy Carter's final day in office, the last hostages were finally set free due to the Algiers Accords. Mohammad Reza Pahlavi left the United States for Egypt, where he died of complications from cancer only months later, on 27 July 1980.

The Cultural Revolution began in 1980, with an initial closure of universities for three years, in order to perform an inspection and clean up in the cultural policy of the education and training system.

On 22 September 1980, the Iraqi army invaded the western Iranian province of Khuzestan, initiating the Iran–Iraq War. Although the forces of Saddam Hussein made several early advances, by mid-1982, the Iranian forces successfully managed to drive the Iraqi army back into Iraq. In July 1982, with Iraq thrown on the defensive, the regime of Iran decided to invade Iraq and conducted countless offensives to conquer Iraqi territory and capture cities, such as Basra. The war continued until 1988, when the Iraqi army defeated the Iranian forces inside Iraq and pushed the remaining Iranian troops back across the border. Subsequently, Khomeini accepted a truce mediated by the United Nations. The total Iranian casualties in the war were estimated to be 123,220–160,000 KIA, 60,711 MIA, and 11,000–16,000 civilians killed.

Following the Iran–Iraq War, in 1989, Akbar Hashemi Rafsanjani and his administration concentrated on a pragmatic pro-business policy of rebuilding and strengthening the economy without making any dramatic break with the ideology of the revolution. In 1997, Rafsanjani was succeeded by moderate reformist Mohammad Khatami, whose government attempted, unsuccessfully, to make the country more free and democratic.

The 2005 presidential election brought conservative populist candidate, Mahmoud Ahmadinejad, to power. By the time of the 2009 Iranian presidential election, the Interior Ministry announced incumbent President Ahmadinejad had won 62.63% of the vote, while Mir-Hossein Mousavi had come in second place with 33.75%. The election results were widely disputed, and resulted in widespread protests, both within Iran and in major cities outside the country, and the creation of the Iranian Green Movement.

Hassan Rouhani was elected as the president on 15 June 2013, defeating Mohammad Bagher Ghalibaf and four other candidates. The electoral victory of Rouhani relatively improved the relations of Iran with other countries.

The 2017–18 Iranian protests swept across the country against the government and its longtime Supreme Leader in response to the economic and political situation. The scale of protests throughout the country and the number of people participating were significant, and it was formally confirmed that thousands of protesters were arrested. The 2019–20 Iranian protests started on 15 November in Ahvaz, spreading across the country within hours, after the government announced increases in the fuel price of up to 300%. A week-long total Internet shutdown throughout the country marked one of the most severe Internet blackouts in any country, and in the bloodiest governmental crackdown of the protestors in the history of Islamic Republic, tens of thousands were arrested and hundreds were killed within a few days according to multiple international observers, including Amnesty International.

On 3 January 2020, the revolutionary guard's general, Qasem Soleimani, was assassinated by the United States in Iraq, which considerably heightened the existing tensions between the two countries. Three days after, Iran's Islamic Revolutionary Guard Corps launched a retaliatory attack on US forces in Iraq and by accident shot down Ukraine International Airlines Flight 752, killing all members on board the plane and leading to nation-wide protests. An international investigation led to the government admitting to the shootdown of the plane by a surface-to-air missile after three days of denial, calling it a "human error".

Protests against the government began on 16 September 2022 following the death of Mahsa Amini after being arrested by the Guidance Patrol.

Geography

It is the fourth-largest country entirely in Asia and the second-largest country in Western Asia behind Saudi Arabia. It lies between latitudes 24° and 40° N, and longitudes 44° and 64° E. It is bordered to the northwest by Armenia, the Azeri exclave of Nakhchivan, and the Republic of Azerbaijan; to the north by the Caspian Sea; to the northeast by Turkmenistan; to the east by Afghanistan and Pakistan; to the south by the Persian Gulf and the Gulf of Oman; and to the west by Iraq and Turkey.

Iran is located in a seismically active area. On average, an earthquake of magnitude seven on the Richter scale occurs once every ten years. Most earthquakes are shallow-focus and can be very devastating, such as the tragic 2003 Bam earthquake.

Iran consists of the Iranian Plateau, with the exception of the coasts of the Caspian Sea and Khuzestan. It is one of the world's most mountainous countries, its landscape dominated by rugged mountain ranges that separate various basins or plateaus from one another.

The northern part of Iran is covered by the lush lowland Caspian Hyrcanian mixed forests, located near the southern shores of the Caspian Sea. The eastern part consists mostly of desert basins, such as the Kavir Desert, which is the country's largest desert, and the Lut Desert, as well as some salt lakes. Iran had a 2019 Forest Landscape Integrity Index mean score of 7.67/10, ranking it 34th globally out of 172 countries.
The only large plains are found along the coast of the Caspian Sea and at the northern end of the Persian Gulf, where the country borders the mouth of the Arvand river. Smaller, discontinuous plains are found along the remaining coast of the Persian Gulf, the Strait of Hormuz, and the Gulf of Oman.

Climate

Iran's climate is diverse, ranging from arid and semi-arid, to subtropical along the Caspian coast and the northern forests. On the northern edge of the country (the Caspian coastal plain), temperatures rarely fall below freezing and the area remains humid for the rest of the year. Summer temperatures rarely exceed . Gary Lewis, the United Nations Resident Coordinator for Iran, has said that "Water scarcity poses the most severe human security challenge in Iran today".

To the west, settlements in the Zagros basin experience lower temperatures, severe winters with below zero average daily temperatures and heavy snowfall. Average summer temperatures rarely exceed . The coastal plains of the Persian Gulf and Gulf of Oman in southern Iran have mild winters, and very humid and hot summers.

Despite climate change in the region, Iran is by far the largest of the few countries in the world which have not ratified the Paris Agreement.

Wildlife

The wildlife of Iran includes bears, the Eurasian lynx, foxes, gazelles, gray wolves, jackals, panthers, and wild pigs. Eagles, falcons, partridges, pheasants, and storks are also native to Iran.

One of the most famous species of animal is the critically endangered Asiatic cheetah, also known as the Iranian cheetah, whose numbers were greatly reduced after the 1979 Revolution. The Persian leopard, which is the world's largest leopard subspecies and lives primarily in northern Iran, is also endangered. Iran lost all its Asiatic lions and the now extinct Caspian tigers by the earlier part of the 20th century.

At least 74 species of Iranian wildlife are on the red list of the International Union for Conservation of Nature, a sign of serious threats against the country's biodiversity. The Iranian Parliament has been showing disregard for wildlife by passing laws and regulations such as the act that lets the Ministry of Industries and Mines exploit mines without the involvement of the Department of Environment, and by approving large national development projects without demanding comprehensive study of their impact on wildlife habitats.

Administrative divisions

Iran is divided into five regions with 31 provinces, each governed by an appointed governor. The provinces are divided into counties, and subdivided into districts and sub-districts.

The country has one of the highest urban growth rates in the world. From 1950 to 2002, the urban proportion of the population increased from 27% to 60%. Most internal migrants have settled around the cities of Tehran, Isfahan, Ahvaz, and Qom. The listed populations are from the 2006/07 (1385 AP) census.

Iran's population is concentrated in its western half, especially in the north, north-west and west of the country.

Tehran, with a population of around 8.8 million (2016 census), is Iran's capital and largest city. It is an economical and cultural center, and is the hub of the country's communication and transport network.
It is also home to the world's largest shopping mall, Iran Mall.

The country's second most populous city, Mashhad, has a population of around 3.3 million (2016 census), and is capital of the province of Razavi Khorasan. Being the site of the Imam Reza shrine, it is a holy city in Shia Islam. About 15 to 20 million pilgrims visit the shrine every year.

Isfahan has a population of around 2.2 million (2016 census), and is Iran's third most populous city. It is the capital of Isfahan province, and was also the third capital of the Safavid Empire. It is home to a wide variety of historical sites, including the famous Shah Square, Siosepol, and the churches at the Armenian district of New Julfa. It is also home to one of the world's largest shopping malls, Isfahan City Center.

The fourth most populous city of Iran, Karaj, has a population of around 1.9 million (2016 census). It is a major industrial city in Iran, with large factories producing sugar, textiles, wire, and alcohol.

With a population of around 1.7 million (2016 census), Tabriz is the fifth most populous city of Iran, and had been the second most populous until the late 1960s. It was the first capital of the Safavid Empire and is now the capital of the province of East Azerbaijan. It is also considered the country's second major industrial city (after Tehran).

Shiraz, with a population of around 1.8 million (2016 census), is Iran's sixth most populous city. It is the capital of the province of Fars, and was also the capital of Iran under the reign of the Zand dynasty. It is located near the ruins of Persepolis and Pasargadae, two of the four capitals of the Achaemenid Empire.

Government and politics

The political system of the Islamic Republic is based on the 1979 Constitution. Juan José Linz wrote in 2000 that "it is difficult to fit the Iranian regime into the existing typology, as it combines the ideological bent of totalitarianism with the limited pluralism of authoritarianism and holds regular elections in which candidates advocating differing policies and incumbents are often defeated". However, Iran scored lower than Saudi Arabia in the 2021 Democracy Index.

Supreme Leader

The Leader of the Revolution ("Supreme Leader") is responsible for delineation and supervision of the policies of the Islamic Republic of Iran. The Iranian president has limited power compared to the Supreme Leader Khamenei. The current longtime Supreme Leader, Ali Khamenei, has been issuing decrees and making the final decisions on the economy, environment, foreign policy, education, national planning, and everything else in the country. Khamenei also outlines elections guidelines and urges for the transparency, and has fired and reinstated presidential cabinet appointments. Key ministers are selected with the Supreme Leader Ali Khamenei's agreement and he has the ultimate say on Iran's foreign policy. The Supreme Leader is directly involved in ministerial appointments for Defense, Intelligence and Foreign Affairs, as well as other top ministries after submission of candidates from the president. Iran's regional policy is directly controlled by the office of the Supreme Leader with the Ministry of Foreign Affairs' task limited to protocol and ceremonial occasions. All of Iran's ambassadors to Arab countries, for example, are chosen by the Quds Corps, which directly reports to the Supreme Leader. The Supreme Leader can also order laws to be amended. Setad, estimated at $95 billion in 2013 by the Reuters, accounts of which are secret even to the Iranian parliament, is controlled only by the Supreme Leader.

The Supreme Leader is the commander-in-chief of the armed forces, controls the military intelligence and security operations, and has sole power to declare war or peace. The heads of the judiciary, the state radio and television networks, the commanders of the police and military forces, and six of the twelve members of the Guardian Council are directly appointed by the Supreme Leader.

The Assembly of Experts is responsible for electing the Supreme Leader, and has the power to dismiss him on the basis of qualifications and popular esteem. To date, the Assembly of Experts has not challenged any of the Supreme Leader's decisions, nor has it attempted to dismiss him. The previous head of the judicial system, Sadeq Larijani, appointed by the Supreme Leader, said that it is illegal for the Assembly of Experts to supervise the Supreme Leader. Due to Khamenei's very longtime unchallenged rule, many believe the Assembly of Experts has become a ceremonial body without any real power. There have been instances when the current Supreme Leader publicly criticized members of the Assembly of Experts, resulting in their arrest and dismissal. For example, Khamenei publicly called then-member of the Assembly of Experts Ahmad Azari Qomi a traitor, resulting in Qomi's arrest and eventual dismissal from the Assembly of Experts. Another instance is when Khamenei indirectly called Akbar Hashemi Rafsanjani a traitor for a statement he made, causing Rafsanjani to retract it.

Guardian Council
Presidential candidates and parliamentary candidates must be approved by the Guardian Council (all members of which are directly or indirectly appointed by the Leader) or the Leader before running to ensure their allegiance to the Supreme Leader. The Leader very rarely does the vetting himself directly but has the power to do so, in which case additional approval of the Guardian Council would not be needed. The Leader can also revert the decisions of the Guardian Council. The Guardian Council can, and has dismissed some elected members of the Iranian parliament in the past. For example, Minoo Khaleghi was disqualified by Guardian Council even after winning election, as she had been photographed in a meeting without wearing headscarf.

President

After the Supreme Leader, the Constitution defines the President of Iran as the highest state authority. The President is elected by universal suffrage for a term of four years, however, the president is still required to gain the Leader's official approval before being sworn in before the Parliament (Majlis). The Leader also has the power to dismiss the elected president anytime. The President can only be re-elected for one term.

The President is responsible for the implementation of the constitution, and for the exercise of executive powers in implementing the decrees and general policies as outlined by the Supreme Leader, except for matters directly related to the Supreme Leader, who has the final say in all matters. Unlike the executive in other countries, the President of Iran does not have full control over anything, as these are ultimately under the control of the Supreme Leader. Chapter IX of the Constitution of the Islamic Republic of Iran sets forth the qualifications for presidential candidates. The procedures for presidential election and all other elections in Iran are outlined by the Supreme Leader. The President functions as the executive of affairs such as signing treaties and other international agreements, and administering national planning, budget, and state employment affairs, all as approved by the Supreme Leader.

The President appoints the ministers, subject to the approval of the Parliament, as well as the approval of the Supreme Leader, who can dismiss or reinstate any of the ministers at any time, regardless of the decisions made by the President or the Parliament. The President supervises the Council of Ministers, coordinates government decisions, and selects government policies to be placed before the legislature. The current Supreme Leader, Ali Khamenei, has fired as well as reinstated Council of Ministers members. Eight Vice Presidents serve under the President, as well as a cabinet of twenty-two ministers, who must all be approved by the legislature.

Legislature

The legislature of Iran, known as the Islamic Consultative Assembly, is a unicameral body comprising 290 members elected for four-year terms. It drafts legislation, ratifies international treaties, and approves the national budget. All parliamentary candidates and all legislation from the assembly must be approved by the Guardian Council.

The Guardian Council comprises twelve jurists, including six appointed by the Supreme Leader. Others are elected by the Parliament, from among the jurists nominated by the Head of the Judiciary. The Council interprets the constitution and may veto the Parliament. If a law is deemed incompatible with the constitution or Sharia (Islamic law), it is referred back to the Parliament for revision. The Expediency Council has the authority to mediate disputes between the Parliament and the Guardian Council, and serves as an advisory body to the Supreme Leader, making it one of the most powerful governing bodies in the country. Local city councils are elected by public vote to four-year terms in all cities and villages of Iran.

Law

The Supreme Leader appoints the head of the country's judiciary, appointing the head of the Supreme Court and the chief public prosecutor. There are several types of courts, including public courts that deal with civil and criminal cases, and revolutionary courts which deal with certain categories of offenses, such as crimes against national security. The decisions of the revolutionary courts are final and cannot be appealed.

The Chief Justice of Iran is the head of the Judicial system of the Islamic Republic of Iran and is responsible for its administration and supervision. He is also the highest judge of the Supreme Court of Iran. The Supreme Leader of Iran appoints and can dismiss the Chief Justice. The Chief Justice nominates some candidates for serving as minister of justice, and then the President select one of them. The Chief Justice can serve for two five-year terms.

The Special Clerical Court handles crimes allegedly committed by clerics, although it has also taken on cases involving laypeople. The Special Clerical Court functions independently of the regular judicial framework, and is accountable only to the Supreme Leader. The Court's rulings are final and cannot be appealed. The Assembly of Experts, which meets for one week annually, comprises 86 "virtuous and learned" clerics elected by adult suffrage for eight-year terms.

Foreign relations

Since the time of the 1979 Revolution, Iran's foreign relations have often been portrayed as being based on two strategic principles: eliminating outside influences in the region, and pursuing extensive diplomatic contacts with developing and non-aligned countries.

Since 2005, Iran's nuclear program has become the subject of contention with the international community, mainly the United States. Many countries have expressed concern that Iran's nuclear program could divert civilian nuclear technology into a weapons program. This has led the United Nations Security Council to impose sanctions against Iran which had further isolated Iran politically and economically from the rest of the global community. In 2009, the U.S. Director of National Intelligence said that Iran, if choosing to, would not be able to develop a nuclear weapon until 2013.

, the government of Iran maintains diplomatic relations with 99 members of the United Nations, but not with the United States, and not with Israel—a state which Iran's government has derecognized since the 1979 Revolution. Among Muslim nations, Iran has an adversarial relationship with Saudi Arabia due to different political and Islamic ideologies. While Iran is a Shia Islamic Republic, Saudi Arabia is a conservative Sunni monarchy. Regarding the Israeli–Palestinian conflict, the government of Iran has recognized Jerusalem as the capital of the State of Palestine, after Trump recognized Jerusalem as the capital of Israel.

Since the 2000s, Iran's controversial nuclear program has raised concerns, which is part of the basis of the international sanctions against the country. On 14 July 2015, Tehran and the P5+1 came to a historic agreement (Joint Comprehensive Plan of Action) to end economic sanctions in exchange for Iran's restriction in producing enriched uranium after demonstrating a peaceful nuclear research project that would meet the International Atomic Energy Agency standards.

Iran is a member of dozens of international organizations, including the G-15, G-24, G-77, IAEA, IBRD, IDA, IDB, IFC, ILO, IMF, IMO, Interpol, OIC, OPEC, WHO, and the United Nations, and currently has observer status at the World Trade Organization.

On 17 September 2021 Iran began the processes of becoming a full member of the Shanghai Cooperation Organization (SCO), a Eurasian political, economic, and security alliance.

Military

The Islamic Republic of Iran has two types of armed forces: the regular forces of the Army, the Air Force, and the Navy, and the Revolutionary Guards, totaling about 545,000 active troops. Iran also has around 350,000 Reserve Force, totaling around 900,000 trained troops.

The government of Iran has a paramilitary, volunteer militia force within the Islamic Revolutionary Guard Corps, called the Basij, which includes about 90,000 full-time, active-duty uniformed members. Up to 11 million men and women are members of the Basij who could potentially be called up for service. In 2007, Iran's military spending represented 2.6% of the GDP or $102 per capita, the lowest figure of the Persian Gulf nations. Iran's military doctrine is based on deterrence. In 2014, the country spent $15 billion on arms, while the states of the Gulf Cooperation Council spent eight times more.

The government of Iran supports the military activities of its allies in Syria, Iraq, and Lebanon (Hezbollah) with military and financial aid. Iran and Syria are close strategic allies, and Iran has provided significant support for the Syrian Government in the Syrian Civil War. According to some estimates, Iran controlled over 80,000 pro-Assad Shi'ite fighters in Syria.

Since the 1979 Revolution, to overcome foreign embargoes, the government of Iran has developed its own military industry, produced its own tanks, armored personnel carriers, missiles, submarines, military vessels, missile destroyer, radar systems, helicopters, and fighter planes. In recent years, official announcements have highlighted the development of weapons such as the Hoot, Kowsar, Zelzal, Fateh-110, Shahab-3, Sejjil, and a variety of unmanned aerial vehicles (UAVs). Iran has the largest and most diverse ballistic missile arsenal in the Middle East. The Fajr-3, a liquid fuel missile with an undisclosed range which was developed and produced domestically, is currently the most advanced ballistic missile of the country.

In June 1925, Reza Shah introduced conscription law at National Consultative Majlis. At that time, every male person who had reached 21 years old must serve in the military for two years. The conscription exempted women from military service after 1979 revolution. Iranian constitution obliges all men of 18 years old and higher to serve on military or police bases. They cannot leave the country or be employed without completion of the service period. The period varies from 18 to 24 months.

Human rights

Iran's human rights record is exceptionally poor. The regime in Iran is undemocratic, has frequently persecuted and arrested critics of the government and its Supreme Leader, and severely restricts the participation of candidates in popular elections as well as other forms of political activity. Women's rights in Iran are described as seriously inadequate, and children's rights have been severely violated, with more child offenders being executed in Iran than in any other country in the world. Sexual activity between members of the same sex is illegal and is punishable by up to death.

Over the past decade, numbers of anti-government protests have broken out throughout Iran (such as the 2019–20 Iranian protests), demanding reforms or the end to the Islamic Republic. However, the Islamic Revolutionary Guard Cops (IRGC) and police often suppressed mass protests violently, resulting in thousands of protesters being killed.

Censorship in Iran

Censorship in Iran under the government of the Islamic Republic was ranked among the most extreme worldwide.

Iran also has strict regulations when it comes to internet censorship, with the government and the Islamic Revolutionary Guard Corps persistently blocking social media and other websites. In January 2021, Iranian authorities added Signal to the list of blocked social media platforms, which included Facebook, Telegram, Twitter and YouTube. They carried out arbitrary arrests for social media postings deemed "counter-revolutionary" or "un-Islamic".

Economy

Iran's economy is a mixture of central planning, state ownership of oil and other large enterprises, village agriculture, and small-scale private trading and service ventures. In 2017, GDP was $427.7 billion ($1.631 trillion at PPP), or $20,000 at PPP per capita. Iran is ranked as a lower-middle income economy by the World Bank. In the early 21st century, the service sector contributed the largest percentage of the GDP, followed by industry (mining and manufacturing) and agriculture.

The Central Bank of the Islamic Republic of Iran is responsible for developing and maintaining the Iranian rial, which serves as the country's currency. The government does not recognize trade unions other than the Islamic labour councils, which are subject to the approval of employers and the security services. The minimum wage in June 2013 was 487 million rials a month ($134). Unemployment has remained above 10% since 1997, and the unemployment rate for women is almost double that of the men.

In 2006, about 45% of the government's budget came from oil and natural gas revenues, and 31% came from taxes and fees. , Iran had earned $70 billion in foreign-exchange reserves, mostly (80%) from crude oil exports. Iranian budget deficits have been a chronic problem, mostly due to large-scale state subsidies, that include foodstuffs and especially gasoline, totaling more than $84 billion in 2008 for the energy sector alone. In 2010, the economic reform plan was approved by parliament to cut subsidies gradually and replace them with targeted social assistance. The objective is to move towards free market prices in a five-year period and increase productivity and social justice.

The administration continues to follow the market reform plans of the previous one, and indicates that it will diversify Iran's oil-reliant economy. Iran has also developed a biotechnology, nanotechnology, and pharmaceutical industry. However, nationalized industries such as the bonyads have often been managed badly, making them ineffective and uncompetitive with years. Currently, the government is trying to privatize these industries, and, despite successes, there are still several problems to be overcome, such as the lagging corruption in the public sector and lack of competitiveness.

Iran has leading manufacturing industries in the fields of automobile manufacture, transportation, construction materials, home appliances, food and agricultural goods, armaments, pharmaceuticals, information technology, and petrochemicals in the Middle East. According to the 2012 data from the Food and Agriculture Organization, Iran has been among the world's top five producers of apricots, cherries, sour cherries, cucumbers and gherkins, dates, eggplants, figs, pistachios, quinces, walnuts, and watermelons.

Economic sanctions against Iran, such as the embargo against Iranian crude oil, have injured the economy. In 2015, Iran and the P5+1 reached a deal on the nuclear program that removed the main sanctions pertaining to Iran's nuclear program by 2016. According to the BBC, renewed U.S. sanctions against Iran "have led to a sharp downturn in Iran's economy, pushing the value of its currency to record lows, quadrupling its annual inflation rate, driving away foreign investors, and triggering protests".

Tourism

Although tourism declined significantly during the war with Iraq, it has been subsequently recovered. About 1,659,000 foreign tourists visited Iran in 2004, and 2.3 million in 2009, mostly from Asian countries, including the republics of Central Asia, while about 10% came from the European Union and North America. Since the removal of some sanctions against Iran in 2015, tourism has re-surged in the country. Over five million tourists visited Iran in the fiscal year of 2014–2015, four percent more than the previous year.

Alongside the capital, the most popular tourist destinations are Isfahan, Mashhad, and Shiraz. In the early 2000s, the industry faced serious limitations in infrastructure, communications, industry standards, and personnel training. Several organized tours from Germany, France, and other European countries come to Iran annually to visit archaeological sites and monuments. In 2003, Iran ranked 68th in tourism revenues worldwide. According to the UNESCO and the deputy head of research for Iran's Tourism Organization, Iran is rated fourth among the top 10 destinations in the Middle East. Domestic tourism in Iran is one of the largest in the world.

Transportation

Iran has a long paved road system linking most of its towns and all of its cities. In 2011 the country had  of roads, of which 73% were paved. In 2008 there were nearly 100 passenger cars for every 1,000 inhabitants.

Trains operate on 11,106 km (6,942 mi) of railroad track. The country's major port of entry is Bandar-Abbas on the Strait of Hormuz. After arriving in Iran, imported goods are distributed throughout the country by trucks and freight trains. The Tehran–Bandar-Abbas railroad, opened in 1995, connects Bandar-Abbas to the railroad system of Central Asia via Tehran and Mashhad. Other major ports include Bandar e-Anzali and Bandar e-Torkeman on the Caspian Sea and Khorramshahr and Bandar-e Emam Khomeyni on the Persian Gulf.

Dozens of cities have airports that serve passenger and cargo planes. Iran Air, the national airline, was founded in 1962 and operated domestic and international flights. All large cities have mass transit systems using buses, and several private companies provide bus services between cities.

Transport in Iran is inexpensive because of the government's subsidization of the price of gasoline. The downside is a huge draw on government coffers, economic inefficiency because of highly wasteful consumption patterns, smuggling to neighboring countries and air pollution. In 2008, more than one million people worked in the transportation sector, accounting for 9% of GDP.

Energy

Iran has the world's second largest proved gas reserves after Russia, with 33.6 trillion cubic meters, and the third largest natural gas production after Indonesia and Russia. It also ranks fourth in oil reserves with an estimated 153,600,000,000 barrels. It is OPEC's second largest oil exporter, and is an energy superpower.
In 2005, Iran spent US$4 billion on fuel imports, because of contraband and inefficient domestic use. Oil industry output averaged  in 2005, compared with the peak of six million barrels per day reached in 1974. In the early 2000s, industry infrastructure was increasingly inefficient because of technological lags. Few exploratory wells were drilled in 2005.

In 2004, a large share of Iran's natural gas reserves were untapped. The addition of new hydroelectric stations and the streamlining of conventional coal and oil-fired stations increased installed capacity to 33,000 megawatts. Of that amount, about 75% was based on natural gas, 18% on oil, and 7% on hydroelectric power. In 2004, Iran opened its first wind-powered and geothermal plants, and the first solar thermal plant was to come online in 2009. Iran is the world's third country to have developed GTL technology.

Demographic trends and intensified industrialization have caused electric power demand to grow by 8% per year. The government's goal of 53,000 megawatts of installed capacity by 2010 is to be reached by bringing on line new gas-fired plants, and adding hydropower and nuclear power generation capacity. Iran's first nuclear power plant at Bushire went online in 2011. It is the second nuclear power plant ever built in the Middle East after the Metsamor Nuclear Power Plant in Armenia.

Education, science and technology

Education in Iran is highly centralized. K–12 is supervised by the Ministry of Education, and higher education is under the supervision of the Ministry of Science and Technology.

The rate of adult literacy (among Iranians of ages 10 to 49) has reached 96% on March 19, 2020; while according to UNESCO it had rated 85.0% in 2008 (up from 36.5% in 1976).

According to the data provided by UNESCO, Iran's literacy rate among people aged 15 years and older was 85.54% as of 2016, with men (90.35%) being significantly more educated than women (80.79%), with the number of illiterate people of the same age amounting to around 8,700,000 of the country's 85 million population. According to this report, Iranian government's expenditure on education amounts to around 4% of the GDP.

The requirement to enter into higher education is to have a high school diploma and pass the Iranian University Entrance Exam (officially known as konkur (کنکور)), which is the equivalent of the SAT and ACT exams of the United States. Many students do a 1–2-year course of pre-university (piš-dānešgāh), which is the equivalent of the GCE A-levels and the International Baccalaureate. The completion of the pre-university course earns students the Pre-University Certificate.

Iran's higher education is sanctioned by different levels of diplomas, including an associate degree (kārdāni; also known as fowq e diplom) delivered in two years, a bachelor's degree (kāršenāsi; also known as lisāns) delivered in four years, and a master's degree (kāršenāsi e aršad) delivered in two years, after which another exam allows the candidate to pursue a doctoral program (PhD; known as doktorā).

According to the Webometrics Ranking of World Universities, Iran's top five universities include Tehran University of Medical Sciences (478th worldwide), the University of Tehran (514th worldwide), Sharif University of Technology (605th worldwide), Amirkabir University of Technology (726th worldwide), and the Tarbiat Modares University (789th worldwide). Iran was ranked 60th in the Global Innovation Index in 2021, up from 67th in 2020.

Iran has increased its publication output nearly tenfold from 1996 through 2004, and has been ranked first in terms of output growth rate, followed by China. According to a study by SCImago in 2012, Iran would rank fourth in the world in terms of research output by 2018, if the current trend persists.

In 2009, a SUSE Linux-based HPC system made by the Aerospace Research Institute of Iran (ARI) was launched with 32 cores, and now runs 96 cores. Its performance was pegged at 192 GFLOPS. The Iranian humanoid robot Sorena 2, which was designed by engineers at the University of Tehran, was unveiled in 2010. The Institute of Electrical and Electronics Engineers (IEEE) has placed the name of Surena among the five prominent robots of the world after analyzing its performance.

In the biomedical sciences, Iran's Institute of Biochemistry and Biophysics has a UNESCO chair in biology. In late 2006, Iranian scientists successfully cloned a sheep by somatic cell nuclear transfer, at the Royan Research Center in Tehran.

According to a study by David Morrison and Ali Khadem Hosseini (Harvard-MIT and Cambridge), stem cell research in Iran is amongst the top 10 in the world. Iran ranks 15th in the world in nanotechnologies.

Iran placed its domestically built satellite Omid into orbit on the 30th anniversary of the 1979 Revolution, on 2February 2009, through its first expendable launch vehicle Safir, becoming the ninth country in the world capable of both producing a satellite and sending it into space from a domestically made launcher.

The Iranian nuclear program was launched in the 1950s. Iran is the seventh country to produce uranium hexafluoride, and controls the entire nuclear fuel cycle.

Iranian scientists outside Iran have also made some major contributions to science. In 1960, Ali Javan co-invented the first gas laser, and fuzzy set theory was introduced by Lotfi A. Zadeh. Iranian cardiologist Tofigh Mussivand invented and developed the first artificial cardiac pump, the precursor of the artificial heart. Furthering research and treatment of diabetes, the HbA1c was discovered by Samuel Rahbar. A substantial number of papers in string theory are published in Iran. Iranian American string theorist Cumrun Vafa proposed the Vafa–Witten theorem together with Edward Witten. In August 2014, Iranian mathematician Maryam Mirzakhani became the first woman, as well as the first Iranian, to receive the Fields Medal, the highest prize in mathematics.

Demographics

Iran is a diverse country, consisting of numerous ethnic and linguistic groups that are unified through a shared Iranian nationality.

Iran's population grew rapidly during the latter half of the 20th century, increasing from about 19 million in 1956 to about 85 million by February 2023. However, Iran's fertility rate has dropped significantly in recent years, coming down from a fertility rate of 6.5 per woman to just a little more than 1.7 two decades later, leading to a population growth rate of about 1.39% as of 2018. Due to its young population, studies project that the growth will continue to slow until it stabilizes around 105 million by 2050.

Iran hosts one of the largest refugee populations in the world, with almost one million refugees, mostly from Afghanistan and Iraq. Since 2006, Iranian officials have been working with the UNHCR and Afghan officials for their repatriation. According to estimates, about five million Iranian citizens have emigrated to other countries, mostly since the 1979 Revolution.

According to the Iranian Constitution, the government is required to provide every citizen of the country with access to social security, covering retirement, unemployment, old age, disability, accidents, calamities, health and medical treatment and care services. This is covered by tax revenues and income derived from public contributions.

Languages

The majority of the population speaks Persian, which is also the official language of the country. Others include speakers of several other Iranian languages within the greater Indo-European family and languages belonging to some other ethnicities living in Iran.

In northern Iran, mostly confined to Gilan and Mazenderan, the Gilaki and Mazenderani languages are widely spoken, both having affinities to the neighboring Caucasian languages. In parts of Gilan, the Talysh language is also widely spoken, which stretches up to the neighboring Republic of Azerbaijan. Varieties of Kurdish are widely spoken in the province of Kurdistan and nearby areas. In Khuzestan, several distinct varieties of Persian are spoken. Luri and Lari are also spoken in southern Iran.

Azerbaijani, which is by far the most spoken language in the country after Persian, as well as several other Turkic languages and dialects, is spoken in various regions of Iran, especially in the region of Azerbaijan.

Notable minority languages in Iran include Armenian, Georgian, Neo-Aramaic, and Arabic. Khuzi Arabic is spoken by the Arabs in Khuzestan, as well as the wider group of Iranian Arabs. Circassian was also once widely spoken by the large Circassian minority, but, due to assimilation over the many years, no sizable number of Circassians speak the language anymore.

Percentages of spoken language continue to be a point of debate, as many opt that they are politically motivated; most notably regarding the largest and second largest ethnicities in Iran, the Persians and Azerbaijanis. Percentages given by the CIA's World Factbook include 53% Persian, 16% Azerbaijani, 10% Kurdish, 7% Mazenderani and Gilaki, 7% Luri, 2% Turkmen, 2% Balochi, 2% Arabic, and 2% the remainder Armenian, Georgian, Neo-Aramaic, and Circassian.

Ethnic groups

As with the spoken languages, the ethnic group composition also remains a point of debate, mainly regarding the largest and second largest ethnic groups, the Persians and Azerbaijanis, due to the lack of Iranian state censuses based on ethnicity. The CIA's World Factbook has estimated that around 79% of the population of Iran is a diverse Indo-European ethno-linguistic group that comprise speakers of various Iranian languages, with Persians (including Mazenderanis and Gilaks) constituting 61% of the population, Kurds 10%, Lurs 6%, and Balochs 2%. Peoples of other ethnolinguistic groups make up the remaining 21%, with Azerbaijanis constituting 16%, Arabs 2%, Turkmens and other Turkic tribes 2%, and others (such as Armenians, Talysh, Georgians, Circassians, Assyrians) 1%.

The Library of Congress issued slightly different estimates: 65% Persians (including Mazenderanis, Gilaks, and the Talysh), 16% Azerbaijanis, 7% Kurds, 6% Lurs, 2% Baloch, 1% Turkic tribal groups (incl. Qashqai and Turkmens), and non-Iranian, non-Turkic groups (incl. Armenians, Georgians, Assyrians, Circassians, and Arabs) less than 3%. It determined that Persian is the first language of at least 65% of the country's population, and is the second language for most of the remaining 35%.

Religion

Twelver Shia Islam is the official state religion, to which about 90% to 95% of the population adhere. About 4% to 8% of the population are Sunni Muslims, mainly Kurds and Baloches. The remaining 2% are non-Muslim religious minorities, including Christians, Zoroastrians, Jews, Baháʼís, Mandaeans, and Yarsanis.

A 2020 survey by the World Values Survey found that 96.6% of Iranians believe in Islam.  On the other hand, another 2020 survey conducted online by an organization based outside of Iran found a much smaller percentage of Iranians identifying as Muslim (32.2% as Shia, 5.0% as Sunni, and 3.2% as Sufi), and a significant fraction not identifying with any organized religion (22.2% identifying as "None," and some others identifying as atheists, spiritual, agnostics, and secular humanists). According to the CIA World Factbook, around 90–95% of Iranian Muslims associate themselves with the Shia branch of Islam, the official state religion, and about 5–10% with the Sunni and Sufi branches of Islam.

There are a large population of adherents of Yarsanism, a Kurdish indigenous religion, making it the largest (unrecognized) minority religion in Iran. Its followers are mainly Gorani Kurds and certain groups of Lurs. They are based in Kurdistan Province, Kermanshah Province and Lorestan mainly.

Christianity, Judaism, Zoroastrianism, and the Sunni branch of Islam are officially recognized by the government and have reserved seats in the Iranian Parliament. Historically, early Iranian religions such as the Proto-Iranic religion and the subsequent Zoroastrianism and Manichaeism were the dominant religions in Iran, particularly during the Median, Achaemenid, Parthian, and Sasanian eras. This changed after the fall of the Sasanian Empire by the centuries-long Islamization that followed the Muslim Conquest of Iran. Iran was predominantly Sunni until the conversion of the country (as well as the people of what is today the neighboring Republic of Azerbaijan) to Shia Islam by order of the Safavid dynasty in the 16th century.

Judaism has a long history in Iran, dating back to the Achaemenid conquest of Babylonia. Although many left in the wake of the establishment of the State of Israel and the 1979 Revolution, about 8,756 to 25,000 Jewish people live in Iran. Iran has the largest Jewish population in the Middle East outside of Israel.

Around 250,000 to 370,000 Christians reside in Iran, and Christianity is the country's largest recognized minority religion. Most are of Armenian background, as well as a sizable minority of Assyrians. A large number of Iranians have converted to Christianity from the predominant Shia Islam.

The Baháʼí Faith is not officially recognized and has been subject to official persecution. According to the United Nations Special Rapporteur on Human Rights in Iran, Baháʼís are the largest non-Muslim religious minority in Iran, with an estimated 350,000 adherents. Since the 1979 Revolution, the persecution of Baháʼís has increased with executions and denial of civil rights, especially the denial of access to higher education and employment.

Iranian officials have continued to support the rebuilding and renovation of Armenian churches in the Islamic Republic. The Armenian Monastic Ensembles of Iran has also received continued support. In 2019, the Iranian government registered the Holy Savior Cathedral, commonly referred to as Vank Cathedral, in the New Julfa district of Isfahan, as a UNESCO World Heritage Site, with significant expenditures for its congregation. Currently three Armenian churches in Iran have been included in the UNESCO World Heritage List.

Culture

The earliest attested cultures in Iran date back to the Lower Paleolithic. Owing to its geopolitical position, Iran has influenced cultures as far as Greece and Italy to the west, Russia to the north, the Arabian Peninsula to the south, and south and east Asia to the east.

Art

The art of Iran encompasses many disciplines, including architecture, stonemasonry, metalworking, weaving, pottery, painting, and calligraphy. Iranian works of art show a great variety in style, in different regions and periods. The art of the Medes remains obscure, but has been theoretically attributed to the Scythian style. The Achaemenids borrowed heavily from the art of their neighboring civilizations, but produced a synthesis of a unique style, with an eclectic architecture remaining at sites such as Persepolis and Pasargadae. Greek iconography was imported by the Seleucids, followed by the recombination of Hellenistic and earlier Near Eastern elements in the art of the Parthians, with remains such as the Temple of Anahita and the Statue of the Parthian Nobleman. By the time of the Sasanians, Iranian art came across a general renaissance. Although of unclear development, Sasanian art was highly influential, and spread into far regions. Taq-e-Bostan, Taq-e-Kasra, Naqsh-e-Rostam, and the Shapur-Khwast Castle are among the surviving monuments from the Sasanian period.

During the Middle Ages, Sasanian art played a prominent role in the formation of both European and Asian medieval art, which carried forward to the Islamic world, and much of what later became known as Islamic learning—including medicine, architecture, philosophy, philology, and literature—were of Sasanian basis.

The Safavid era is known as the Golden Age of Iranian art, and Safavid works of art show a far more unitary development than in any other period, as part of a political evolution that reunified Iran as a cultural entity. Safavid art exerted noticeable influences upon the neighboring Ottomans, the Mughals, and the Deccans, and was also influential through its fashion and garden architecture on 11th–17th-century Europe.

Iran's contemporary art traces its origins back to the time of Kamal-ol-Molk, a prominent realist painter at the court of the Qajar dynasty who affected the norms of painting and adopted a naturalistic style that would compete with photographic works. A new Iranian school of fine art was established by Kamal-ol-Molk in 1928, and was followed by the so-called "coffeehouse" style of painting.

Iran's avant-garde modernists emerged by the arrival of new western influences during World War II. The vibrant contemporary art scene originates in the late 1940s, and Tehran's first modern art gallery, Apadana, was opened in September 1949 by painters Mahmud Javadipur, Hosein Kazemi, and Hushang Ajudani. The new movements received official encouragement by the mid-1950s, which led to the emergence of artists such as Marcos Grigorian, signaling a commitment to the creation of a form of modern art grounded in Iran.

Architecture

The history of architecture in Iran goes back to the seventh millennium BC. Iranians were among the first to use mathematics, geometry and astronomy in architecture. Iranian architecture displays great variety, both structural and aesthetic, developing gradually and coherently out of earlier traditions and experience. The guiding motif of Iranian architecture is its cosmic symbolism, "by which man is brought into communication and participation with the powers of heaven".

Iran ranks seventh among UNESCO's list of countries with the most archaeological ruins and attractions from antiquity.

Traditionally, the guiding formative motif of Iranian architecture has been its cosmic symbolism "by which man is brought into communication and participation with the powers of heaven". This theme has not only given unity and continuity to the architecture of Persia but has been a primary source of its emotional character as well.

According to Persian historian and archaeologist Arthur Pope, the supreme Iranian art, in the proper meaning of the word, has always been its architecture. The supremacy of architecture applies to both pre- and post-Islamic periods.

Weaving

Iran's carpet-weaving has its origins in the Bronze Age and is one of the most distinguished manifestations of Iranian art. Iran is the world's largest producer and exporter of handmade carpets, producing three-quarters of the world's total output and having a share of 30% of world's export markets.

Literature

Iran's oldest literary tradition is that of Avestan, the Old Iranian sacred language of the Avesta, which consists of the legendary and religious texts of Zoroastrianism and the ancient Iranian religion, with its earliest records dating back to the pre-Achaemenid times.

Of the various modern languages used in Iran, Persian, various dialects of which are spoken throughout the Iranian Plateau, has the most influential literature. Persian has been dubbed as a worthy language to serve as a conduit for poetry, and is considered one of the four main bodies of world literature. Despite originating from the region of Persis (better known as Persia) in southwestern Iran, the Persian language was used and developed further through Persianate societies in Asia Minor, Central Asia, and South Asia, leaving massive influences on Ottoman and Mughal literatures, among others.

Iran has a number of famous medieval poets, most notably Rumi, Ferdowsi, Hafez, Sa'adi, Omar Khayyam, and Nezami Ganjavi. Iranian literature also inspired writers such as Johann Wolfgang von Goethe, Henry David Thoreau, and Ralph Waldo Emerson.

Philosophy

Iranian philosophy originates from Indo-European roots, with Zoroaster's reforms having major influences.

According to The Oxford Dictionary of Philosophy, the chronology of the subject and science of philosophy starts with the Indo-Iranians, dating this event to 1500 BC. The Oxford dictionary also states, "Zarathushtra's philosophy entered to influence Western tradition through Judaism, and therefore on Middle Platonism."

While there are ancient relations between the Indian Vedas and the Iranian Avesta, the two main families of the Indo-Iranian philosophical traditions were characterized by fundamental differences, especially in their implications for the human being's position in society and their view of man's role in the universe.

The Cyrus Cylinder, which is known as "the first charter of human rights", is often seen as a reflection of the questions and thoughts expressed by Zoroaster, and developed in Zoroastrian schools of the Achaemenid era. The earliest tenets of Zoroastrian schools are part of the extant scriptures of the Zoroastrian religion in Avestan. Among them are treatises such as the Zatspram, Shkand-gumanik Vizar, and Denkard, as well as older passages of the Avesta and the Gathas.

The current trends in Iranian philosophy have grown limited in scope because of Islamic frames of thought  although the liberal ways of thought remain open to be generated in Iranian publications by Iranian intellectuals, especially outside Iran, where the Iranian regime has less power to restrict Iranian thought and philosophy.

Mythology

Iranian mythology consists of ancient Iranian folklore and stories, all involving extraordinary beings, reflecting attitudes towards the confrontation of good and evil, actions of the gods, and the exploits of heroes and fabulous creatures.

Myths play a crucial part in Iranian culture, and understanding of them is increased when they are considered within the context of actual events in Iranian history. The geography of Greater Iran, a vast area covering present-day Iran, the Caucasus, Anatolia, Mesopotamia and Central Asia, with its high mountain ranges, plays the main role in much of Iranian mythology.

Tenth-century Persian poet Ferdowsi's long epic poem Šāhnāme ("Book of Kings"), which is for the most part based on Xwadāynāmag, a Middle Persian compilation of the history of Iranian kings and heroes from mythical times down to the reign of Chosroes II, is considered the national epic of Iran. It draws heavily on the stories and characters of the Zoroastrian tradition, from the texts of the Avesta, the Denkard, and the Bundahishn.

Music

Iran is the apparent birthplace of the earliest complex instruments, dating back to the third millennium BC. The use of both vertical and horizontal angular harps have been documented at the sites Madaktu and Kul-e Farah, with the largest collection of Elamite instruments documented at Kul-e Farah. Multiple depictions of horizontal harps were also sculpted in Assyrian palaces, dating back between 865 and 650 BC.

Xenophon's Cyropaedia mentions a great number of singing women at the court of the Achaemenid Empire. Athenaeus of Naucratis, in his Deipnosophistae, points out to the capture of Achaemenid singing girls at the court of the last Achaemenid king Darius III (336–330 BC) by Macedonian general Parmenion. Under the Parthian Empire, the gōsān (Parthian for "minstrel") had a prominent role in the society. According to Plutarch's Life of Crassus (32.3), they praised their national heroes and ridiculed their Roman rivals. Likewise, Strabo's Geographica reports that the Parthian youth were taught songs about "the deeds both of the gods and of the noblest men".

The history of Sasanian music is better documented than the earlier periods and is especially more evident in Avestan texts. By the time of Chosroes II, the Sasanian royal court hosted a number of prominent musicians, namely Azad, Bamshad, Barbad, Nagisa, Ramtin, and Sarkash.

Iranian traditional musical instruments include string instruments such as chang (harp), qanun, santur, rud (oud, barbat), tar, dotar, setar, tanbur, and kamanche, wind instruments such as sorna (zurna, karna) and ney, and percussion instruments such as tompak, kus, daf (dayere), and naqare.

Iran's first symphony orchestra, the Tehran Symphony Orchestra, was founded by Qolam-Hoseyn Minbashian in 1933. It was reformed by Parviz Mahmoud in 1946, and is currently Iran's oldest and largest symphony orchestra. Later, by the late 1940s, Ruhollah Khaleqi founded the country's first national music society, and established the School of National Music in 1949.

Iranian pop music has its origins in the Qajar era. It was significantly developed since the 1950s, using indigenous instruments and forms accompanied by electric guitar and other imported characteristics. The emergence of genres such as rock in the 1960s and hip hop in the 2000s also resulted in major movements and influences in Iranian music.

Theater

The earliest recorded representations of dancing figures within Iran were found in prehistoric sites such as Tepe Sialk and Tepe Mūsīān. The oldest Iranian initiation of theater and the phenomena of acting can be traced in the ancient epic ceremonial theaters such as Sug-e Siāvuš ("mourning of Siāvaš"), as well as dances and theater narrations of Iranian mythological tales reported by Herodotus and Xenophon.

Iran's traditional theatrical genres include Baqqāl-bāzi ("grocer play", a form of slapstick comedy), Ruhowzi (or Taxt-howzi, comedy performed over a courtyard pool covered with boards), Siāh-bāzi (in which the central comedian appears in blackface), Sāye-bāzi (shadow play), Xeyme-šab-bāzi (marionette), and Arusak-bāzi (puppetry), and Ta'zie (religious tragedy plays).

Before the 1979 Revolution, the Iranian national stage had become a famous performing scene for known international artists and troupes, with the Roudaki Hall of Tehran constructed to function as the national stage for opera and ballet. Opened on 26 October 1967, the hall is home to the Tehran Symphony Orchestra, the Tehran Opera Orchestra, and the Iranian National Ballet Company, and was officially renamed Vahdat Hall after the 1979 Revolution.

Loris Tjeknavorian's Rostam and Sohrab, based on the tragedy of Rostam and Sohrab from Ferdowsi's epic poem Šāhnāme, is an example of opera with Persian libretto. Tjeknavorian, a celebrated Iranian Armenian composer and conductor, composed it in 25 years, and it was finally performed for the first time at Tehran's Roudaki Hall, with Darya Dadvar in the role of Tahmina.

Cinema and animation

A third-millennium BC earthen goblet discovered at the Burnt City, a Bronze Age urban settlement in southeastern Iran, depicts what could possibly be the world's oldest example of animation. The artifact, associated with Jiroft, bears five sequential images depicting a wild goat jumping up to eat the leaves of a tree. The earliest attested Iranian examples of visual representations, however, are traced back to the bas-reliefs of Persepolis, the ritual center of the Achaemenid Empire. The figures at Persepolis remain bound by the rules of grammar and syntax of visual language. The Iranian visual arts reached a pinnacle by the Sasanian era, and several works from this period have been found to articulate movements and actions in a highly sophisticated manner. It is even possible to see a progenitor of the cinematic close-up shot in one of these works of art, which shows a wounded wild pig escaping from the hunting ground.

By the early 20th century, the five-year-old industry of cinema came to Iran. The first Iranian filmmaker was probably Mirza Ebrahim (Akkas Bashi), the court photographer of Mozaffar-ed-Din Shah of the Qajar dynasty. Mirza Ebrahim obtained a camera and filmed the Qajar ruler's visit to Europe. Later in 1904, Mirza Ebrahim (Sahhaf Bashi), a businessman, opened the first public movie theater in Tehran. After him, several others like Russi Khan, Ardeshir Khan, and Ali Vakili tried to establish new movie theaters in Tehran. Until the early 1930s, there were around 15 cinema theaters in Tehran and 11 in other provinces. The first Iranian feature film, Abi and Rabi, was a silent comedy directed by Ovanes Ohanian in 1930. The first sounded one, Lor Girl, was produced by Ardeshir Irani and Abd-ol-Hosein Sepanta in 1932.

Iran's animation industry began by the 1950s, and was followed by the establishment of the influential Institute for the Intellectual Development of Children and Young Adults in January 1965. The 1960s was a significant decade for Iranian cinema, with 25 commercial films produced annually on average throughout the early 60s, increasing to 65 by the end of the decade. The majority of the production focused on melodrama and thrillers. With the screening of the films Qeysar and The Cow, directed by Masoud Kimiai and Dariush Mehrjui respectively in 1969, alternative films set out to establish their status in the film industry and Bahram Beyzai's Downpour and Nasser Taghvai's Tranquility in the Presence of Others followed soon. Attempts to organize a film festival, which had begun in 1954 within the framework of the Golrizan Festival, resulted in the festival of Sepas in 1969. The endeavors also resulted in the formation of Tehran's World Film Festival in 1973.

After the Revolution of 1979, and following the Cultural Revolution, a new age emerged in Iranian cinema, starting with Long Live! by Khosrow Sinai and followed by many other directors, such as Abbas Kiarostami and Jafar Panahi. Kiarostami, an acclaimed Iranian director, planted Iran firmly on the map of world cinema when he won the Palme d'Or for Taste of Cherry in 1997. The continuous presence of Iranian films in prestigious international festivals, such as the Cannes Film Festival, the Venice Film Festival, and the Berlin International Film Festival, attracted world attention to Iranian masterpieces. In 2006, six Iranian films, of six different styles, represented Iranian cinema at the Berlin International Film Festival. Critics considered this a remarkable event in the history of Iranian cinema.

Asghar Farhadi, a well-known Iranian director, has received a Golden Globe Award and two Academy Awards, representing Iran for Best Foreign Language Film in 2012 and 2017. In 2012, he was named as one of the 100 Most Influential People in the world by the American news magazine Time.

Observances

Iran's official New Year begins with Nowruz, an ancient Iranian tradition celebrated annually on the vernal equinox. It is enjoyed by people adhering to different religions, but is considered a holiday for the Zoroastrians. It was registered on the UNESCO's list of Masterpieces of the Oral and Intangible Heritage of Humanity in 2009, described as the Persian New Year, shared with a number of other countries in which it has historically been celebrated.

On the eve of the last Wednesday of the preceding year, as a prelude to Nowruz, the ancient festival of Čāršanbe Suri celebrates Ātar ("fire") by performing rituals such as jumping over bonfires and lighting off firecrackers and fireworks. The Nowruz celebrations last by the end of the 13th day of the Iranian year (Farvardin 13, usually coincided with 1or 2April), celebrating the festival of Sizdebedar, during which the people traditionally go outdoors to picnic.

Yaldā, another nationally celebrated ancient tradition, commemorates the ancient goddess Mithra and marks the longest night of the year on the eve of the winter solstice (usually falling on 20 or 21 December), during which families gather together to recite poetry and eat fruits—particularly the red fruits watermelon and pomegranate, as well as mixed nuts. In some regions of the provinces of Mazanderan and Markazi, there is also the midsummer festival of Tirgān, which is observed on Tir 13 (2 or 3July) as a celebration of water.

Alongside the ancient Iranian celebrations, Islamic annual events such as Ramezān, Eid e Fetr, and Ruz e Āšurā are marked by the country's large Muslim population, Christian traditions such as Noel, Čelle ye Ruze, and Eid e Pāk are observed by the Christian communities, Jewish traditions such as Purim, Hanukā, and Eid e Fatir (Pesah) are observed by the Jewish communities, and Zoroastrian traditions such as Sade and Mehrgān are observed by the Zoroastrians.

Public holidays

Iran's official calendar is the Solar Hejri calendar, beginning at the vernal equinox in the Northern Hemisphere, which was first enacted by the Iranian Parliament on 31 March 1925. Each of the 12 months of the Solar Hejri calendar correspond with a zodiac sign, and the length of each year is absolutely solar. The months are named after the ancient Iranian months, namely Farvardin, Ordibehešt, Xordād, Tir, Amordād, Šahrivar, Mehr, Ābān, Āzar, Dey, Bahman, and Esfand.

Alternatively, the Lunar Hejri calendar is used to indicate Islamic events, and the Gregorian calendar remarks the international events.

Legal public holidays based on the Iranian solar calendar include the cultural celebrations of Nowruz (Farvardin 1–4; 21–24 March) and Sizdebedar (Farvardin 13; 2April), and the political events of Islamic Republic Day (Farvardin 12; 1April), the death of Ruhollah Khomeini (Khordad 14; 4June), the Khordad 15 event (Khordad 15; 5June), the anniversary of the 1979 Revolution (Bahman 22; 10 February), and Oil Nationalization Day (Esfand 29; 19 March).

Lunar Islamic public holidays include Tasua (Muharram 9), Ashura (Muharram 10), Arba'een (Safar 20), the death of Muhammad (Safar 28), the death of Ali al-Ridha (Safar 29 or 30), the birthday of Muhammad (Rabi-al-Awwal 17), the death of Fatimah (Jumada-al-Thani 3), the birthday of Ali (Rajab 13), Muhammad's first revelation (Rajab 27), the birthday of Muhammad al-Mahdi (Sha'ban 15), the death of Ali (Ramadan 21), Eid al-Fitr (Shawwal 1–2), the death of Ja'far al-Sadiq (Shawwal 25), Eid al-Qurban (Zulhijja 10), and Eid al-Qadir (Zulhijja 18).

Cuisine

Due to its variety of ethnic groups and the influences from the neighboring cultures, the cuisine of Iran is diverse. Herbs, along with fruits such as plums, pomegranate, quince, prunes, apricots, and raisins, are frequently used. To achieve a balanced taste, characteristic flavorings such as saffron, dried lime, cinnamon, and parsley are mixed delicately and used in some special dishes. Onion and garlic are commonly used in the preparation of the accompanying course, but are also served separately during meals, either in raw or pickled form.

Iranian cuisine includes a wide range of main dishes, including various types of kebab, pilaf, stew (khoresh), soup and āsh, and omelette. Lunch and dinner meals are commonly accompanied by side dishes such as plain yogurt or mast-o-khiar, sabzi, salad Shirazi, and torshi, and might follow dishes such as borani, Mirza Qasemi, or kashk e bademjan as the appetizer.

In Iranian culture, tea is widely consumed. Iran is the world's seventh major tea producer, and a cup of tea is typically the first thing offered to a guest. One of Iran's most popular desserts is the falude, consisting of vermicelli in a rose water syrup, which has its roots in the fourth century BC. There is also the popular saffron ice cream, known as bastani sonnati ("traditional ice cream"), which is sometimes accompanied with carrot juice. Iran is also famous for its caviar.

Sports

Iran is most likely the birthplace of polo, locally known as čowgān, with its earliest records attributed to the ancient Medes. Freestyle wrestling is traditionally considered the national sport of Iran, and the national wrestlers have been world champions on many occasions. Iran's traditional wrestling, called košti e pahlevāni ("heroic wrestling"), is registered on UNESCO's Intangible Cultural Heritage list.

Being a mountainous country, Iran is a venue for skiing, snowboarding, hiking, rock climbing, and mountain climbing. It is home to several ski resorts, the most famous being Tochal, Dizin, and Shemshak, all within one to three hours traveling from the capital city Tehran. The resort of Tochal, located in the Alborz mountain rage, is the world's fifth-highest ski resort ( at its highest station).

Iran's National Olympic Committee was founded in 1947. Wrestlers and weightlifters have achieved the country's highest records at the Olympics. In September 1974, Iran became the first country in West Asia to host the Asian Games. The Azadi Sport Complex, the largest sports complex in Iran, was originally built for this occasion.

Football has been regarded as the most popular sport in Iran, with the men's national team having won the Asian Cup on three occasions. The men's national team has maintained its position as Asia's best team, ranking first in Asia and 22nd in the world according to the FIFA World Rankings.

Volleyball is the second most popular sport in Iran. Having won the 2011 and 2013 Asian Men's Volleyball Championships, the men's national team is currently the strongest team in Asia, and ranks eighth in the FIVB World Rankings.

Basketball is also popular, with the men's national team having won three Asian Championships since 2007.

In 2016, Iran made global headlines for international female champions boycotting tournaments in Iran in chess (U.S. Woman Grandmaster Nazí Paikidze) and in shooting (Indian world champion Heena Sidhu), as they refused to enter a country where they would be forced to wear a hijab.

Media

According to the Press Freedom Index, Iran holds one of the lowest positions, ranking 174th out of 180 countries as of 2021. The Ministry of Culture and Islamic Guidance is Iran's main government department responsible for the cultural policy, including activities regarding communications and information.

Iran's first newspapers were published during the reign of Naser al-Din Shah of the Qajar dynasty in the mid-19th century. Most of the newspapers published in Iran are in Persian, the country's official language. The country's most widely circulated periodicals are based in Tehran, among which are Etemad, Ettela'at, Kayhan, Hamshahri, Resalat, and Shargh. Tehran Times, Iran Daily, and Financial Tribune are among English-language newspapers based in Iran.

Television was introduced in Iran in 1958. Although the 1974 Asian Games were broadcast in color, full color programming began in 1978. Since the 1979 Revolution, Iran's largest media corporation is the Islamic Republic of Iran Broadcasting (IRIB). Despite the restrictions on non-domestic television, about 65% of the residents of the capital city and about 30 to 40% of the residents outside the capital city access worldwide television channels through satellite dishes, although observers state that the figures are likely to be higher.

Iran received access to the Internet in 1993. According to Internet World Stats, around 69.1% of the population of Iran are Internet users. Iran ranks 17th among countries by number of Internet users. According to the statistics provided by the web information company of Alexa, Google Search is Iran's most widely used search engine and Instagram is the most popular online social networking service. Direct access to many worldwide mainstream websites has been blocked in Iran, including Facebook, which has been blocked since 2009 due to the organization of anti-governmental protests on the website. However, Facebook has around 40 million subscribers based in Iran (48.8% of the population) who use virtual private networks and proxy servers to access the website. Some of the officials themselves have verified accounts on the social networking websites that are blocked by the authorities, including Facebook and Twitter. About 90% of Iran's e-commerce takes place on the Iranian online store of Digikala, which has around 750,000 visitors per day and more than 2.3 million subscribers and is the most visited online store in the Middle East.

Fashion and clothing 

Fashion in Iran is divided into several historical periods. The exact date of the emergence of weaving in Iran is not yet known, but it is likely to coincide with the emergence of civilization. Clothing in Iran is mentioned in Persian mythology. Ferdowsi and many historians have considered Keyumars to be the inventor of the use of animals' skin and hair as clothing. Some historians have also mentioned Hushang as the first inventor of the use of living skins as clothing. Ferdowsi considers Tahmuras to be a kind of textile initiator in Iran. There are historical discoveries in northern Iran from about 6000 BC that refer to wool weaving at the time. Other discoveries in central Iran dating back to 4200 BC have shown that the animals' skin has not been the only clothing worn on the Iranian Plateau since those years. The clothing of ancient Iran took an advanced form, and the fabric and color of clothing became very important at that time. Depending on the social status, eminence, climate of the region and the season, Persian clothing during the Achaemenian period took various forms. The philosophy used in this clothing, in addition to being functional, also had an aesthetic role.

Beauty pageant festivals inside Iran were not held after the 1979 revolution, and the last selection ceremony of the "beauty queen of Iran" was held in 1978 in this country. Since then, many Iranian girls have participated in the Beauty pageant and Miss Universe outside of Iran. Sahar Biniaz (Miss Universe Canada 2012) and Shermineh Shahrivar (Miss Germany and Miss Europe) are examples of Iranian models outside Iran. Girls of Enghelab Street was a series of protests in 2017–2019 against a compulsory hijab in Iran.

See also

List of Iran-related topics
Outline of Iran

Explanatory notes

References

Bibliography

Iran: A Country Study. 2008, Washington, DC: Library of Congress, 354 pp.

External links
The e-office of the Supreme Leader of Iran
The President of Iran
Iran.ir  
Iran. The World Factbook. Central Intelligence Agency.

 
6th-century BC establishments
Countries in Asia
G15 nations
Iranian Plateau
Islamic republics
Member states of OPEC
Member states of the Organisation of Islamic Cooperation
Member states of the United Nations
Middle Eastern countries
Near Eastern countries
Persian-speaking countries and territories
Persia
States and territories established in the 6th century BC
States and territories established in 1979
Western Asian countries
1979 establishments in Iran
Former monarchies of Western Asia
Kurdish-speaking countries and territories
Developing 8 Countries member states
Theocracies